Company C, 1st Battalion, 181st Infantry Regiment is a rifle company in the 181st Infantry Regiment. In the National Guard, companies often have two histories. They share the history of the regiment to which they are assigned, but also may have a unique company history and lineage. Therefore, Company C 1-181 IN shares the long history of the 181st Infantry Regiment. This site concentrates on the unique history of Company C as a militia / National Guard company in Cambridge, Massachusetts. The company traces its history to 1831 when it was first mustered as the Cambridge Light Infantry. It later served with Union forces in the American Civil War, and as a federalized Massachusetts National Guard regiment with the U.S. Army during the Spanish–American War, Mexican Border Campaign, World War I and World War II. Most recently Company C has served in Bosnia, at Guantanamo Bay, Cuba, New Orleans following Hurricane Katrina, Iraq and Afghanistan.

History

Formation
The present Company C 1-181 IN was first mustered in 1831 as the Cambridge Light Infantry.  The company was formed as a "more professional" force because the other Cambridge companies were considered "mere gentlemen's clubs".  The Cambridge Light Infantry was soon considered the finest company in the military service and a model for the new light companies that were formed throughout the Commonwealth.

Civil War
In 1861 mobilized for the Civil War as the Cambridge City Guard with the 20th Massachusetts Volunteer Infantry (The Harvard Regiment). Among the officers of the company were Major Paul J. Revere, and Lieutenant Oliver Wendell Holmes Jr. The 20th regiment lost 17 officers and 243 enlisted men killed and mortally wounded. One officer and 148 enlisted men by disease. The regiment ranks first among Massachusetts regiments and fifth among Union regiments in total casualties. In 1866 the Cambridge City Guard became Company F of the 5th Mass.

National Guard and overseas service
In June 1898 The Cambridge City Guard was mobilized for the war with Spain along with the

5th Mass. and served at Gunville, South Carolina.

The land forces of the Massachusetts Volunteer Militia were redesignated as the Massachusetts National Guard on 15 November 1907.

In June 1916 the Cambridge Guard was sent to the Mexican border as Company A of the 8th Mass. Infantry. The 8th Mass. served on the Mexican Border at El Paso, Texas.

World War I
In the First World War, the company sent many of its soldiers to the 101st Infantry, the remainder of the company served in France as part of the 5th Pioneer Infantry Regiment. The pioneer regiments included such specialists as mechanics, carpenters, carriers, and masons. They were supposed to work under the direction of the engineers to build roads, bridges, gun emplacements, and camps "within the sound of the guns". They received standard infantry training so that they could defend themselves, but there are very few documented instances of any pioneer troops unslinging their rifles. They were demobilized in January 1919 at Camp Wadsworth.

On 1 April 1923, the Cambridge City Guard was designated as Company H of the 101st Infantry Regiment.

World War II
Company H was mobilized in January 1941 for one year of training with the Yankee Division. The year of training ended in December 1941 but the company's service continued after the Japanese attack on Pearl Harbor brought the United States into the Second World War. Company H, 101st Infantry deployed to Europe with the Yankee Division and fought from Normandy across Germany to meet the Soviets in Czechoslovakia at war's end. The company served in the Army of Occupation in Austria until 1946.

In 1946, the Cambridge City Guard was re-established as Company H, 101st Infantry, and later was designated as Company C of the 1-182 IN. The company served through the Cold War.

Later service
In 1995, the Cambridge Guard became Company C, 1-181 IN (Light).

In August 2001, Company C 1-181 IN mobilized for service in Bosnia-Herzegovina as an element of the NATO Stabilization Force. (SFOR 10)

On 8 September 2003, Company C, 1-181 Infantry was mobilized for one-year duty at Guantanamo Bay, Cuba providing security for the detention facilities at Camp America and Camp Delta in support of Operation Enduring Freedom.

In September 2005, Company C mobilized as an element of JTF Yankee for rescue and security operations in New Orleans following Hurricane Katrina.

In July 2007, C Company mobilized in support of Operation Iraqi Freedom. The unit served as an operational support team. The mission was to provide security for theater counterintelligence operations, for the commander of Multi-National Forces-Iraq (MNFI). The company was awarded the Joint Meritorious Unit Award.

In August 2010, Company C 1-181 IN deployed for one year of service with the International Security Force in Afghanistan in support of Operation Enduring Freedom. The company provided command and control at Camp Alamo in Kabul and conducted security operations in Khost, Paktya and Paktika Provinces.

Battles
American Civil War, Cambridge City Guard, 20th Massachusetts Infantry
 Battle of Balls Bluff
 The Peninsula Campaign
 Battle of Antietam
 Battle of Fredericksburg
 Battle of Chancellorsville
 Battle of Gettysburg

Spanish–American War, Cambridge City Guard, 5th Massachusetts Infantry

Mexican Border campaign, Cambridge City Guard, 8th Massachusetts Infantry

World War I, 5th Pioneer Infantry Regiment
 Champagne Marne
 Saint Mihiel
 Meuse Argonne Offensive

World War II, H Company, 101st Infantry Regiment (United States)
 Northern France
 Rhineland
 Ardennes-Alsace
 Central Europe

Global War on Terror, Company C 1-181 IN
 Bosnia SFOR
 Guantanamo Bay
 Iraq
 Afghanistan War (2001–2021)

Unit decorations

See also
 181st Infantry Regiment (United States)
 Headquarters Company 1-181 Infantry (Wellington Rifles)
 Company A 1-181 Infantry (Springfield Rifles)
 Company B 1-181 Infantry
 Company D 1-181 Infantry (Hudson Light Guards)
 1181 Forward Support Company

Notes

Military units and formations in Massachusetts
Companies of the United States Army National Guard